Nurul Amin (15 July 1893 – 2 October 1974) was a prominent Pakistani leader, and a jurist who served as the eighth prime minister of Pakistan and as the first and only vice president of Pakistan. He is noted as being the last Bengali leader of Pakistan. His term of only 13 days as Prime Minister was the shortest served in Pakistani parliamentary history.

Starting his political career in 1948 as Chief Minister of East Bengal, he headed the Ministry of Supply. Still being a Bengali, Amin was against the Bengali language movement in 1952. After participating in the 1970 Pakistani general election, He was appointed as the Prime Minister of Pakistan. He was the first and only Vice President of Pakistan from 1970 till 1972, leading Pakistan in the Liberation War of Bangladesh.

As an anti-war and principal Pakistan Movement activist, Amin is considered within Pakistan a patriot who worked to keep Pakistan united however, he is considered by many Bangladeshis as a traitor who collaborated with an occupying force accused of genocide and other war crimes. He opposed the creation of Bangladesh during the Bangladesh Liberation War – but after the 25 March massacre, he devoted his position to reopening communication channels between the warring sides, curbing wartime crimes and repatriating Bengalis stranded in West Pakistan after the Bangladeshi liberation.

Early life
Amin was born on 15 July 1893 to a Bengali Muslim family in Shahbazpur located in the Tippera District (now in Brahmanbaria District) of the Bengal Presidency. He then moved with his family back to his ancestral village, Bahadurpur, in Nandail, Mymensingh District. In 1915, Amin passed the college entrance examination from Mymensingh Zilla School, joining Ananda Mohan College two years later to obtain his Intermediate in Arts (I.A); he graduated with a bachelor's degree in English literature in 1919.

After graduating, Amin took a position teaching at the local school Gaffargaon Islamia Government High School and then another local school in Calcutta, but decided to pursue his career in law. In 1920, Amin began at the University of Calcutta; he gained an LLB in Law and Justice in 1924, and passed the Bar exam the same year. Amin started his career in law after joining the Mymensingh Judge Court Bar.

Public service
In 1929, Amin was appointed as a member of Mymensingh Local Board, and later became a member of Mymensingh District Board in 1930. In 1932, the British Indian Government appointed him as commissioner of Mymensingh Municipality. In 1937, Amin was appointed as the Chairman of Mymensingh District Board, an assignment he continued until 1945.

During this time, Amin's interest in politics increased. He became an early member of the All-India Muslim League led by Mohammad Ali Jinnah. During this time, Amin was appointed as President of the Muslim League's Mymensingh district unit. In 1944, he was elected vice-president of the Bengal Provincial Muslim League.

In 1945, Amin participated in the Indian general elections, securing a landslide victory. He became a Member, and the following year was elected as the Speaker General of the Bengal Legislative Assembly.

United Pakistan

Pakistan Movement
Amin became a trusted lieutenant of Mohammad Ali Jinnah in East Bengal, fighting for the rights of Bengali Muslims in British India.  Amin took an active part in the Pakistan Movement, organising Bengali Muslims, while he continued to strengthen the Muslim League in Bengal.

In 1946, Jinnah came to visit Bengal, where Amin assisted him. He promised the Bengali nation he would build a democratic country. In East Bengal, Amin promoted the unity of Muslims. By the time of the creation of Pakistan, Amin had become one of the leading advocates and activists of the Pakistan Movement; he had wide approval ratings by the Bengali population.

Chief Minister
After the death of Jinnah, Amin was nominated as the Chief Minister of East Bengal in September 1948 by Khawaja Nazimuddin, who succeeded Jinnah as Governor General.

Amin worked for the Muslim League in East Bengal, while continuing his relief programme for the population. As Chief Minister, his relations were significantly strained with Prime Minister Liaquat Ali Khan and the Governor-General of Pakistan Khawaja Nazimuddin. Soon after the assassination of Liaquat Ali Khan, Amin was appointed as Minister of Supply. He was elected as a member of the Pakistan National Assembly from 1947 until 1954. Amin assumed the office of Chief Minister in a few weeks.

Historians have noted that Amin's government was not strong enough to administer the provincial state; it was completely under the control of the central government of Nazimuddin. His government did not enjoy enough power, and lacked vision, imagination, and initiatives. Amin failed to counter the Communist Party's influence in the region, which widely took the credit for turning the language movement in 1952 into large unified mass protest.

Language Movement

During Amin's term as Chief Minister, Governor General Nazimuddin (also from East Bengal but bilingual) reiterated the federal government's position that while Bengali was the language of virtually all East Pakistanis as well as the majority of Pakistanis as a whole, it was not to be considered a national language on par with Urdu. In response, the Bengali Language Movement developed, and the ruling Muslim League lost popularity in East Pakistan. Both Nazimuddin and Amin failed to integrate the East Pakistani population with that of West Pakistan, and eventually the East Pakistan Muslim League lost significant administrative control of the province. Amin on other hand, held Communist Party responsible for this failure, accusing them as provoking the language movement.

Public dissatisfaction with Amin had grown since October 1951, when Nazimuddin became Prime Minister. Amin expelled dissidents from within the ranks of the Muslim League, but doing so simply strengthened opposition to the party. In early 1952, students protested against Prime Minister Nazimuddin's declaration in the provincial capital Dacca (now Dhaka) that Urdu would be the sole national language. During the unrest, the civilian East-Pakistan police opened fire, killing four student activists. This raised more opposition in the region to the Muslim League. Prime Minister Bogra (also a Bengali) visited East Bengal in early 1954 in an attempt to rally support for the League, but it was too late. Leading politicians in West and East Pakistan called for Amin's resignation, and the new elections were soon held.

1954 elections

In the 1954 provisional elections, the Muslim League was defeated by the United Front, an alliance between the Awami League (led by Huseyn Shaheed Suhrawardy), the Krishak Sramik Party (chaired by A. K. Fazlul Huq), the Nizam Islam Party (headed by Maulana Athar Ali), and the Ganatantri Dal (led by Haji Mohammad Danesh and Mahmud Ali), eventually becoming more and more influential in Pakistani politics. It was in this turnover that Amin lost his assembly seat to a veteran student leader of East Pakistan, Khaleque Nawaz Khan, who had also been active in the Language Movement. The Muslim League was effectively eliminated from the provincial political landscape.

Amin served as the president of the East Pakistan Muslim League, and worked to improve its standing. During this time, the Pakistani authorities made reforms, including granting official status to the Bengali language in 1956 alongside Urdu. But after Army Commander General Mohammad Ayub Khan imposed martial law following the successful October 1958 Pakistani coup d'état against the government of President Iskander Mirza, Amin's political career was halted as Ayub Khan disbanded all political parties in the country.

Leader of the opposition
Amin ran as a candidate in the 1965 presidential elections, in East Pakistan, winning the majority vote in the Parliament of Pakistan. He declined to work with Ayub Khan. The same year, after the death of Fatima Jinnah, Amin succeeded Jinnah as Leader of Opposition, which he held until 1969, after General Yahya Khan imposed martial law again.

Dissolution of East Pakistan

In the 1970 elections, Amin was elected to the National Assembly as one of only two non-Awami League members from East Pakistan. During this time, the Pakistani authority had already become highly unpopular, as the Bengali language movement was suppressed. Civil unrest was sparked by the Language Movement and fuelled by discriminatory practices against the Bengali people; this led to East Pakistan's declaration of independence.

1971 Liberation War

The Bangladesh Liberation War of 1971, as it is now known, escalated as India and Pakistan formally acknowledged the "existence of a state of war between the two countries", even though neither government had formally issued a declaration of war.

Prime Ministership and Vice Presidency

As the situation in his home province of East Pakistan worsened, Amin was appointed Prime Minister by President General Yahya Khan on 6 December 1971. On 20 December 1971, however, Amin's term as prime minister was cut short as Khan resigned, leaving the Deputy Prime Minister (and Foreign Minister) Zulfikar Ali Bhutto to be sworn in as the new president. Two days later, Amin was appointed as Vice President of Pakistan, the only person to have held this post. He was sworn into the post again on 23 April 1972 after the interim constitution came into effect and martial law was lifted. He continued to hold the post until the office was abolished with the entry into force of the new constitution on 14 August 1973.

Postwar

Mr Nurul Amin is remembered true selfless figure, a national hero, regarded by Pakistanis to be a patriot for supporting the unity of his country when Awami Leaguers collaborated with arch enemy India and sided with Indian Army in the break up of the world's largest Muslim nation Islamic Republic of Pakistan .

Death and legacy
Amin stayed in West Pakistan, while his home region achieved independence as the People's Republic of Bangladesh. He died of cardiac arrest at age of 81 in Rawalpindi on 2 October 1974 and was given a public state funeral by Prime Minister Zulfikar Ali Bhutto. He was buried in Jinnah Mausoleum, next to Jinnah. His tomb was specially designed, made of Italian white marble, with golden letters for his name and contributions.

Amin had written an unpublished autobiography. His second-eldest son, Anwarul Amin Makhon, was the former general manager of BCCI Bangladesh and opened Bangladesh Bank's first branch abroad (in London). Anwarul Amin Makhon was married to the Ekushey Padak-winning writer and poet Razia Khan, the daughter of Pakistan Assembly Speaker Tamizuddin Khan, and had two children: banker Kaiser Tamiz Amin and journalist Aasha Mehreen Amin.

References

|-

|-

|-

1893 births
1974 deaths
Bengali politicians
Bengali Muslims
Leaders of the Opposition (Pakistan)
Pakistan Movement activists from Bengal
Pakistani anti-war activists
Pakistani democracy activists
Pakistani educational theorists
Pakistani people of Bengali descent
Prime Ministers of Pakistan
University of Calcutta alumni
Vice presidents of Pakistan
Presidents of Pakistan
Mymensingh Zilla School alumni
Pakistani MNAs 1947–1954
Chief Ministers of East Pakistan
20th-century Bengalis
People from Mymensingh District
Ananda Mohan College alumni
Members of the Constituent Assembly of Pakistan